Autonomous prefectures are one type of autonomous administrative divisions of China, existing at the prefectural level, with either ethnic minorities forming over 50% of the population or being the historic home of significant minorities. Autonomous prefectures are mostly dominated, in population, by the Han Chinese. The official name of an autonomous prefecture includes the most dominant minority in that region, sometimes two, rarely three. For example, a Kazakh (Kazak in official naming system) prefecture may be called Kazak Zizhizhou. Like all other prefectural level divisions, autonomous prefectures are divided into county level divisions. There is one exception: Ili Kazak Autonomous Prefecture contains two prefectures of its own. Under the Constitution of the People's Republic of China, autonomous prefectures cannot be abolished.

Autonomous administrative divisions 

The PRC's autonomous administrative divisions may be found in the first (or top) to third levels of its national administrative divisions thus:

List of autonomous prefectures

Ethnic composition of autonomous prefectures
Note: * - denotes as the second titular ethnic group

Former autonomous prefectures of China
 Hainan Li and Miao Autonomous Prefecture (1952–1988) in Guangdong, abolished because of the establishment of Hainan Province.
 Hedong Hui Autonomous Prefecture (1954–1955) in Gansu, later changed name as Wuzhong Hui Autonomous Prefecture (1955–1958), abolished because of the establishment of Ningxia Hui Autonomous Region.
 Xihaigu Hui Autonomous Prefecture (1953–1955) in Gansu, later changed name as Guyuan Hui Autonomous Prefecture (1955–1958), abolished because of the establishment of Ningxia Hui Autonomous Region.
 Guixi Zhuang Autonomous Prefecture (sub-provincial level, 1953–1955) in Guangxi Province, abolished because of the establishment of Guangxi Zhuang Autonomous Region.
 Bayinhot Mongol Autonomous Prefecture (1954–1956) in Gansu, included today's Dengkou County and Alxa League. The autonomy abolished after it merged into Inner Mongolia Autonomous Region.

Administrative prefecture level units with a population of 30% or more of ethnic minorities 
Excluding prefecture level units of autonomous regions in 2000.

 Hebei: Chengde (Han - 55.32%, Manchu - 39.87%)
 Liaoning: Benxi (Han - 66.84%, Manchu - 30.22%), Dandong(Han - 64.11%, Manchu - 32.99%)
 Hunan: Zhangjiajie (Tujia - 68.40%, Han - 22.81%), Huaihua (Han - 61.33%, Dong - 17.42%, Miao - 15.63%) 
 Guizhou: Anshun (Han - 61.6%, Buyei - 16.92%, Miao - 14.27%), Tongren (Tujia - 37.81%, Han - 31.76%, Miao - 14.87%, Dong - 11.41%) 
 Yunnan: Yuxi (Han - 68,18%, Yi - 19,32%), Pu'er (Han - 40,92%, Hani - 16,98%, Yi - 16.58%, Lahu - 11.47%), Lijiang (Han - 42.71%, Nakhi 20.51%, Yi - 18.68%, Lisu - 9.62%), Lincang (Han - 61.22%, Dai - 15.77%, Lahu and Va - 9.76%)
 Qinghai: Haidong (Han - 56.33%, Hui - 20.38%, Tibetan - 9.2%, Tu - 8.06%)

See also
 List of prefecture-level divisions of China
 Tusi Native Chieftain System
 Autonomous regions of China

External links 
 Regional Autonomy for Ethnic Minorities in China

 
China